The European Renal Association (ERA) is an organisation for clinicians and scientists in nephrology, dialysis, renal transplantation and related areas.

The organisation publishes two scientific journals, NDT - Nephrology Dialysis Transplantation and CKJ - Clinical Kidney Journal, and an online newsletter, Nephrology News Flash. It has an online portal, NEP - Nephrology Education Portal, and holds an annual congress in a different European city every year in May or June.

ERA funds a registry that collects data from dialysis centres in Europe for epidemiological studies and it has a fellowship programme.

The Association has several working groups] and committees established to enhance education, science and networking within a specific area. For example, the ERACODA Working Group was founded to ensure rapid dissemination of information pertaining to COVID-19.

Until 2020, the Annual Congress was always an in-person meeting attended by approximately 7,000 delegates. In 2020, in response to the COVID-19 pandemic, the 57th Annual Congress became fully virtual for the first time.

References

External links
 European Renal Association (ERA)

Charities based in England
Charities based in Wales
International medical associations of Europe
Kidney organizations
Organisations based in Parma